Birkenhead Monks Ferry railway station was a railway station in Birkenhead, Wirral, England. It was situated very close to the River Mersey named after the monks at Birkenhead Priory.
For most of its life, the station was part of the Chester and Birkenhead Railway, a joint railway.

The station was originally opened without authority in April 1838. However, due to the objections and legal proceedings of the operators of the Woodside Ferry the station closed until it was purchased and reopened on 23 October 1844 via an extension of the line from Birkenhead Grange Lane.  Subsequently, Grange Lane closed and Monks Ferry remained the main Birkenhead rail terminus for both passenger and goods traffic until the opening of Birkenhead Woodside on 1 April 1878. After this date, all passenger services were transferred to Woodside and Monks Ferry concentrated on goods and coal supply.

Provision was made at Monks Ferry for a connection to the internal rail system of shipbuilders Cammell Laird, which lay to the south of the station.  This was via a set of sidings, with the connecting track at a right angle to station approaches.

Birkenhead Monks Ferry railway station closed for freight traffic in 1961, although the station and tracks survived until 1967.

The site has since been cleared, with little evidence left of its former use. A residential development now occupies the area.

References

Further reading

External links
 Birkenhead Monks Ferry at Disused Stations

Buildings and structures in Birkenhead
Disused railway stations in the Metropolitan Borough of Wirral
Former Birkenhead Railway stations
Railway stations in Great Britain opened in 1844
Railway stations in Great Britain closed in 1878